Gnathifera hollowayi is a moth in the family Epermeniidae. It was described by Reinhard Gaedike in 1981. It is found in New Caledonia, east of Australia.

References

Epermeniidae
Moths described in 1981
Moths of Oceania
Insects of New Caledonia